The Roskilde Festival 2022 was held on 26 June to 2 July 2022 in Roskilde, Denmark. The festival was headlined by The Blaze, Dua Lipa, Haim, Jada, Kacey Musgraves, Megan Thee Stallion, Post Malone, Robert Plant & Alison Krauss, The Smile, St. Vincent, The Strokes, Thomas Helmig, TLC, Tyler, the Creator.

Headlining set lists
Wednesday, 29 June

Thursday, 30 June
{{Hidden
| headercss = color:#ffffff; background: #FF6200; font-size: 100%; width: 95%;;
| contentcss = text-align: left; font-size: 100%; width: 95%;;
| header = Dua Lipa
| content =

"Physical"
"New Rules"
"Love Again"
"Cool"
"Pretty Please"
"Break My Heart"
"Be the One"
"We're Good"
"Good in Bed"
"Fever"
"Boys Will Be Boys"
"One Kiss"
"Electricity"
"Hallucinate"
"Cold Heart (Pnau remix)"

Encore
"Future Nostalgia"
"Levitating"
"Don't Start Now"
}}

Friday, 1 July

Saturday, 2 July
{{Hidden
| headercss = color:#ffffff; background: #FF6200; font-size: 100%; width: 95%;;
| contentcss = text-align: left; font-size: 100%; width: 95%;;
| header = The Strokes
| content =

"Bad Decisions"
"Juicebox"
"Automatic Stop"
"Hard to Explain"
"Reptilia"
"The Adults Are Talking"
"Selfless"
"What Ever Happened?"
"You Only Live Once"
"New York City Cops"
"Under Cover of Darkness"

Encore
"Eternal Summer"
"Last Nite"
"Someday"
}}

Lineup
Headline performers are listed in boldface. Artists listed from latest to earliest set times.

References

External links

Roskilde Festival by year
2022 music festivals